Aldehuela Castle is a Spanish fortification located on the road between Jaén and Torredelcampo, in the province of Jaén. It was declared a Bien de Interés Cultural landmark according to decree on 22 April 1949.

References 
 Eslava Galán, Juan: Los castillos de Jaén, Ediciones Osuna, Granada, 1999, 
 Valdecantos Dema, Rodrigo. Castillos de Jaén: Descubre el pasado de una tierra fronteriza, 
 Olivares Barragán, Francisco. 'Castillos de la Provincia de Jaén. C.S.I.C. Jaén, 1992, 

Bien de Interés Cultural landmarks in the Province of Jaén (Spain)